Maulana Hassan Jan Madani (Urdu:مولانا حسن جان مدنی ) was a Pakistani Islamic scholar and politician who was born on 6 January 1938 in Prang, Charsadda. He has served as a member of the 8th National Assembly of Pakistan from 30 November 1988 to 6 August 1990. He was Shaikhul-Hadith at Darwesh Masjid in Peshawar and used to deliver Friday sermons in the same mosque. He was also the vice president of Wifaqul-Madaras, the largest board of Islamic universities (Jamiat).

Education 

Hasan Jan memorized the Quran in Masjid e Nabavi in three months. He studied basic mathematics and Arabic grammar from his uncle. He later got admission at Anjuman Taleem-ul-Quran where he learnt basic Urdu and Islamiat. He then moved to Darul-uloom Utmanzai where he completed Dars-e-Nizami. After Dars-e-Nizami, he moved to Jamia Ashrafia Lahore, where he studied Hadith books from Muhammad Idris Kandhlawi and Maulana Muhammad Rasool Khan Hazarvi. He got degree of Fazal-e-Deniat from Darul Uloom Haqqania with distinction. On 11 June 1962 he moved to Madina for further studies at The Islamic University of al-Madinah al-Munawarah. He was awarded gold medal by the University of Peshawar in MA Islamiat for his distinction.

Politics 
Hasan Jan was not a politician however he supported Jamiat Ulema-e-Islam.  He was the teacher of Fazal-ur-Rehman. He contested the 1990 elections and defeated the then Awami National Party leader Abdul Wali Khan in his stronghold. He served as MNA for some time.

Assassination 

On Saturday 17 September 2007 some unknown people came to him near Aftari time and requested him to go with them for Nikah-Khwani. He was assassinated at Wazir Bagh behind Janaz Ga (Funeral Prayer place) in the suburbs of Peshawar. It is believed that he was killed by the unknown persons may be for his moderate views, which included issuing fatwas against suicide bombings.

References 

1938 births
2007 deaths
20th-century Muslim scholars of Islam
Pakistani clergy
Pakistani scholars
Pashtun people
People killed by the Taliban
Jamiat Ulema-e-Islam (F) politicians
Recipients of Sitara-i-Shujaat
Darul Uloom Haqqania alumni
Islamic University of Madinah alumni
University of Peshawar alumni
Deobandis
Vice presidents of Wifaq ul Madaris Al-Arabia
Jamia Ashrafia alumni
Pakistani MNAs 1988–1990
People from Charsadda District, Pakistan